In 2018, there were 30 new This American Life episodes.

Air Date: 2018-01-12

Air Date: 2018-01-19

Air Date: 2018-02-02

Air Date: 2018-02-09

Air Date: 2018-02-23

Air Date: 2018-03-02

Air Date: 2018-03-02

Air Date: 2018-04-06

Air Date: 2018-04-13

Air Date: 2018-04-27

Air Date: 2018-05-04

Air Date: 2018-05-18

Air Date: 2018-05-25

Air Date: 2018-06-08

Air Date: 2018-06-22

Air Date: 2018-06-22

Air Date: 2018-07-13

Air Date: 2018-07-20

Air Date: 2018-08-03

Air Date: 2018-08-10

Air Date: 2018-08-24

Air Date: 2018-09-14

Air Date: 2018-09-21

Air Date: 2018-10-05

Air Date: 2018-10-12

Air Date: 2018-11-02

Air Date: 2018-11-09

Air Date: 2018-11-16

Air Date: 2018-12-07

Air Date: 2018-12-28

References

External links
This American Lifes radio archive for 2018

2018
This American Life
This American Life